This is a list of the number-one Billboard R&B songs of 1992.

Chart history

See also
1992 in music
List of number-one R&B albums of 1992 (U.S.)

References

1992
Number-one RandB singles of 1992 (U.S.)
1992 in American music